The Man Who Saved Christmas is a film based on the true story about the efforts of toymaker Alfred Carlton Gilbert (portrayed by Jason Alexander) of the A. C. Gilbert Company to continue making toys during World War I. First broadcast on CBS television in 2002, it was released on DVD and Blu-ray in 2008.

Plot
During the First World War, A. C. Gilbert, a successful toymaker, is requested by the government to re-tool his factory to help produce goods for the war effort. After speaking with his father and his son, Gilbert initially agrees to this, but comes to regret his decision.

Things get the better of Gilbert as he learns that his brother Frank has been declared missing in action in the war. This and other factors cause Gilbert to confront the government over plans to encourage people not to celebrate Christmas in order to save resources for the war effort. Gilbert successfully lobbies the government to allow him (and other toy manufacturers) to resume the production of toys, in particular the building toy known as an Erector Set, for Christmas, thus earning Gilbert the name "The man who saved Christmas."

Ultimately, Gilbert's brother Frank returns from the war in time to celebrate Christmas.

Cast

Production notes
The erector sets used in the film were the later, smaller versions not made until 1924 and not the original, larger pieces made from 1913 - 1923.

See also 
 List of Christmas films

References

Location 
The Gilbert family home was shot in Spadina House, located next to Casa Loma in Toronto with the Distillery District used for external locations.

External links 
 
 

2002 television films
2002 films
American television films
Canadian drama television films
English-language Canadian films
Films directed by Sturla Gunnarsson
American Christmas drama films
CBS network films
2000s Christmas drama films
Christmas television films
Canadian Christmas drama films
2000s American films
2000s Canadian films